Emerald Point N.A.S is an American primetime soap opera created by Dynastys Richard and Esther Shapiro which premiered on CBS on Monday, September 26, 1983. The series revolved around the lives of personnel stationed on a naval air station somewhere in the Southern California, and combined military and espionage-based storylines with romance and family intrigue. 

Its theme song was composed by Bill Conti, who had previously written the music for other primetime soaps such as Dynasty and Falcon Crest. Emerald Point N.A.S was cancelled after 22 weeks, with its final episode airing March 12, 1984.

Cast and characters

Rear Admiral Thomas Mallory, a military hero and the commanding officer of the Emerald Point N.A.S., is the show's central character. He is a widower and father to three daughters, Celia Warren (Susan Dey), who is unhappy married to JAG lawyer Jack Warren (Charles Frank), Kay (Stephanie Dunnam), who is involved in a love triangle with Lieutenant Glenn Matthews (Andrew Stevens) and his scheming fiancée Hilary Adams (Sela Ward), and Leslie (Doran Clark), an recent graduate of the United States Naval Academy in Annapolis and the first female of the family to serve in the U.S. Navy. 

Thomas enters a relationship with Maggie Farrell (Maud Adams), a representative on the Military Affairs Council of the Chamber of Commerce, and a Navy wife whose husband has been missing in action for over ten years. Other main characters include Lieutenant Simon Adams (Richard Dean Anderson), Hilary's brother, who eventually marries Celia after her divorce from Jack, villainous industrialist Harlan Adams (Patrick O'Neal, then Robert Vaughn), Tom's rival and father of Hilary and Simon, and Deanna Kincaid (Jill St. John), Thomas' unscrupulous former sister-in-law, who becomes involved with Russian KGB agent Yuri Bukharin (Robert Loggia). 

The show ended with an unresolved cliffhanger, with the revelation that Leslie is the possible daughter of Harlan, due to his rape of her mother (as witnessed by Celia), and with Maggie being kidnapped on her wedding day to Tom by maniac David Marquette (Michael Brandon).

Episodes

Ratings

References

External links
 

1983 American television series debuts
1984 American television series endings
American television soap operas
CBS original programming
Television series by 20th Century Fox Television
American military television series
Aviation television series
English-language television shows
Television shows set in California